Reckart Mill, also known as Albright Mill, is a historic grist mill located near Cranesville, Preston County, West Virginia. It was built in 1865, and is a frame, 2 1/2-story gable roofed building that is built, in part, over Muddy Creek. It is notable for its interior structural beam support system of hand hewn pine timbers and mill machinery.  Operations at Reckart Mill ceased in 1943. In 2017 the mill was torn down by the new owners and the surrounding area was clear cut by the owners.

It was listed on the National Register of Historic Places in 1980.

References

Grinding mills on the National Register of Historic Places in West Virginia
Industrial buildings completed in 1865
Buildings and structures in Preston County, West Virginia
Grinding mills in West Virginia
National Register of Historic Places in Preston County, West Virginia
1865 establishments in West Virginia